Walker and Weeks was an architecture firm based in Cleveland, Ohio, founded by Frank Ray Walker (September 29, 1877 - July 9, 1949)  and Harry E. Weeks (October 2, 1871 - December 21, 1935).

Background
Harry Weeks was born October 2, 1871, in W. Springfield, MA, the son of Charles F. and Clarissa Allen Weeks.  He attended MIT where he studied architecture in the Beaux-Arts tradition, graduating in 1893.  He then worked for several prominent Massachusetts architectural firms before owning his own firm in Pittsfield, MA, for 3 years, where he would meet his future business partner. At the suggestion of John M. Carrere, a member of the Cleveland Group Plan Commission, Weeks moved to Cleveland in 1905, where he went to work for the prominent Cleveland architect J. Milton Dyer (1870-1957).

Frank Walker was born September 29, 1877, in Pittsfield, MA, the son of Frank and Helen Theresa (Ranous) Walker.  He also studied architecture in the beaux-arts tradition at MIT, from which he was graduated in 1900.  He subsequently moved to France to study at the Atelier of Monsieur Redon in Paris, and then lived a year in Italy. He returned to practice architecture in Boston, New York, and Pittsburgh before moving to Cleveland in 1905 to work for the firm of J. Milton Dyer.

After working together in Dyer's office, Walker and Weeks opened their own practice in 1911; the office continued to produce work even after Weeks's death, until the early 1950s.  As was often the case with architecture firms, Walker was the designer while Weeks was primarily the businessman.

Works
The firm is most noted for its bank buildings; several dozen were designed in the teens alone. Their best-known bank was the Federal Reserve Bank of Cleveland, built in 1923. However, they also designed a wide variety of commercial, public, ecclesiastic and residential buildings, as well as a number of bridges, during the course of the firm's life. Walker and Weeks were responsible for the Indiana World War Memorial Plaza in Indianapolis, which features a cenotaph based on the Mausoleum of Maussollos.

Walker and Weeks frequently employed sculptor Henry Hering to create sculpture for their projects.

Like many architects the firm produced work in a variety of styles, from Neoclassical, Italian Renaissance and finally, the 1930s, ending in Moderne and/or Art Deco.

Notable buildings

The buildings designed by the firm include:
 Lorain County Savings and Loan Building, Elyria, Ohio, 1916
 First National Bank of Cleveland, Cleveland, 1917
 Goodyear Tire and Rubber Company Building, Akron, Ohio, 1917
 Steubenville Bank and Trust Building, Steubenville, Ohio, 1919
 Public Auditorium, Cleveland, 1922
 Superior Building, Cleveland, 1922
 Federal Reserve Bank of Cleveland, Cleveland, 1923
 Tate House, Tate, Georgia, 1923
 Cleveland Public Library Building, Cleveland, 1925
 Old National Bank Building, Lima, Ohio, 1925
 Allen Memorial Medical Library, Cleveland, 1926
 Indiana World War Memorial, Indianapolis, Indiana, 1927
 Thirty-seventh Division Memorial Bridge, Eyne, Belgium, 1927
 Wolfe Music Building, Cleveland, 1927
 Epworth-Euclid Methodist Church (with Bertram Goodhue), Cleveland, 1928
 St. Paul's Episcopal Church, Cleveland Heights, Ohio 1928
 First Baptist Church, Shaker Heights, Ohio, 1928
 First Church of Christ, Scientist, Cleveland, 1929
 Municipal Stadium, Cleveland, 1931
 Severance Hall, Cleveland, 1931
 Federal Reserve Bank of Cleveland - Pittsburgh Branch, Pittsburgh, 1931
 Central Branch of the Evansville Public Library, Indiana, 1932
 Hope Memorial Bridge (Originally the Lorain-Carnegie Bridge), Cleveland, 1932
 Tomlinson Hall, Case Institute of Technology, Cleveland, 1945
 Highland View Hospital, Highland Hills, Ohio, 1952
 Saint Ann Church, Cleveland Heights, Ohio, 1952

References

 Gaede, Robert C. & Kalin, Robert, editors, Guide to Cleveland Architecture, Cleveland Chapter of the American Institute of Architects, Cleveland, 1990. 
 Johannesen, Eric, A Cleveland Legacy: The Architecture of Walker and Weeks, Kent State University Press, Kent, Ohio, 1999. 
 Johannesen, Eric, Cleveland Architecture: 1876-1976, Western Reserve Historical Society, 1981. 
 Rarick, Holly M., Progressive vision: The Planning of Downtown Cleveland 1903 - 1930, Cleveland Museum of Art, Cleveland, Ohio, 1986.

External links
 Walker and Weeks materials available in the Digital Gallery from Cleveland Public Library

Architecture firms based in Ohio
History of Cleveland
Companies based in Cleveland
Design companies established in 1911
1950s disestablishments in Ohio